Dêmqog may refer to:

Dêmqog, Ngari Prefecture, Tibet
Dêmqog, Nyingchi Prefecture, Tibet